This is a list of members of the Western Australian Legislative Assembly from 2017 to 2021.

List of members

 On 5 February 2018, the Liberal member for Cottesloe and former Premier, Colin Barnett, resigned. Liberal candidate David Honey was elected to replace him at the by-election for Cottesloe on 17 March 2018.
 On 8 May 2018, the independent (former Labor) member for Darling Range, Barry Urban, resigned after the parliamentary procedures and privileges committee recommended his expulsion for "sustained and gross" contempt. Liberal candidate Alyssa Hayden was elected to replace him at the by-election for Darling Range on 23 June 2018.
 On 24 July 2019, the member for Geraldton, Ian Blayney, resigned from the Liberal Party, and sat as an independent until his application to join the WA Nationals was approved on 17 August 2019.

Members of Western Australian parliaments by term
Western Australian Legislative Assembly